Edward Stevenson Marble (September 3, 1846 – January 3, 1900) was a 19th-century American actor and songwriter.  Among other works, he wrote Tuxedo for vaudeville.

He was the son of actor and comedian Dan Marble, and Anna Warren; and the father of Anna Marble, who married playwright Channing Pollock.

References

American male stage actors
1900 deaths
1846 births
19th-century American male actors
American male songwriters
19th-century American musicians
19th-century American male musicians